The Jasper County Courthouse in Monticello, Georgia, United States, is a building from 1907. It was listed on the National Register of Historic Places in 1980. It is notable for being used as the exterior shots for the courthouse in the 1992 film My Cousin Vinny.

The present courthouse structure is the third courthouse to stand in Jasper County.

References

Courthouses on the National Register of Historic Places in Georgia (U.S. state)
Neoclassical architecture in Georgia (U.S. state)
Government buildings completed in 1907
Buildings and structures in Jasper County, Georgia
County courthouses in Georgia (U.S. state)
National Register of Historic Places in Jasper County, Georgia